The Camenița is a small left tributary of the river Danube in Romania. It discharges into the Danube near Gornea.

References

Rivers of Romania
Rivers of Caraș-Severin County